The Mitsui Golden Glove Award, sponsored by Japan's Mitsui Group, is annually awarded to nine fielders in Japan's professional baseball leagues by the Nippon Professional Baseball Association. The players are selected based on votes by TV, radio, and newspaper journalists with over 5 years experience covering Japanese professional baseball. The trophy is accompanied by prize money.

See also
Nippon Professional Baseball#Awards
Baseball awards#Japan
List of Nippon Professional Baseball ERA champions
Major League Baseball Gold Glove Award

References

Baseball in Japan
Mitsui